The 1989–90 Rugby League Premiership was the 16th end of season Rugby League Premiership competition.

The winners were Widnes.

First round

Semi-finals

Final

References

1990 in English rugby league